Presidential elections were held in Nauru on 13 July 2016. Incumbent president Baron Waqa won the election with 88.89 percent of the vote.

Candidates

Results

References

Presidential elections in Nauru
President
Nauru